La Libertad can refer to:

Places
Colombia
La Libertad Province
La Libertad, Colombia, a Yagua village

Ecuador
La Libertad, Ecuador 
La Libertad Canton

El Salvador
La Libertad, La Libertad, a city in La Libertad Department
La Libertad Department (El Salvador), one of the 14 divisions of El Salvador

Honduras
La Libertad, Comayagua
La Libertad, Francisco Morazán

Guatemala
La Libertad, El Petén
La Libertad, Huehuetenango

Mexico
La Libertad, Chiapas

Nicaragua
La Libertad, Chontales

Peru
Department of La Libertad

Philippines
La Libertad, Negros Oriental
La Libertad, Zamboanga del Norte

United States
La Libertad, California

Other uses
La Libertad (film), 2001 Argentine film
"La Libertad" (Álvaro Soler song), song by Álvaro Soler
La Libertad (newspaper), a Colombian newspaper

See also
Libertad (disambiguation)